Military theory is the analysis of normative behavior and trends in military affairs and military history, beyond simply describing events in war. 

Theories and conceptions of warfare have varied in different places throughout human history. The Chinese Sun Tzu is recognized by scholars to be one of the earliest military theorists. His now-iconic Art of War laid the foundations for operational planning, tactics, strategy and logistics.

Military theories, especially since the influence of Clausewitz in the nineteenth century, attempt to encapsulate the complex cultural, political and economic relationships between societies and the conflicts they create. These military theories can encompass tactics like divide and rule, starving out defenders, etc.

See also
 Military doctrine
 Military science
 List of military writers

References
Notes

Bibliography

External links

 
Theory